Tayler Kane is an Australian actor who is best known for his roles in the British soap opera Families and the Australian television series Fire.

Career
A one-time model, Kane made his television debut playing Andrew Stevens in the soap opera, Families. He subsequently appeared on the Australian soap opera, Paradise Beach. He appeared in the 1999 miniseries Tribe. He was a regular cast member in the television drama series Fire and the comedy series Sit Down, Shut Up. He was also the title character in the Legacy of the Silver Shadow playing a computer generation of the long dead superhero Silver Shadow.

He has appeared in films such as The Dish and Queen of the Damned.

External links
 

Australian male television actors
Australian male film actors
Living people
Year of birth missing (living people)